Diego Moreno Escobar (born 16 January 1998), commonly known as Guito, is a Spanish footballer who plays for CD Móstoles URJC as either a left back or a left winger.

Club career
Guito was born in Madrid, and finished his formation with Getafe CF. He made his senior debut with the reserves on 2 April 2017, starting in a 0–2 Tercera División home loss against CD San Fernando de Henares; it was his maiden appearance for the side.

In August 2017, Guito joined San Fernando in the fourth division. On 18 July 2019, after two seasons as a starter, he moved to AD Alcorcón and was initially assigned to the B-team in the same category.

Guito made his first team debut for Alkor on 15 November 2020, starting in a 0–1 away loss against CD Leganés in the Segunda División championship. In July of the following year, after one further first team appearance, he moved to Segunda División RFEF side CD Móstoles URJC.

References

External links

1998 births
Living people
Footballers from the Community of Madrid
Spanish footballers
Association football defenders
Association football wingers
Segunda División players
Tercera División players
Getafe CF B players
CD San Fernando de Henares players
AD Alcorcón B players
AD Alcorcón footballers
CD Móstoles URJC players